Aaron Wainwright (born 25 September 1997) is a Wales international rugby union player who plays for Dragons regional team as a flanker.

Early life
Wainwright originally looked destined for a career in football having been on the books of both Cardiff City and Newport County during his teenage years. He was at Cardiff City from Under 9-16 and was included in the Wales Under 16 football squad. Wainwright played youth rugby for Whiteheads RFC. Wainwright attended Cardiff Metropolitan University and played in the BUCS Super Rugby tournament.

Club career
Wainwright made his debut for the Dragons regional team in 2017 having previously played for Newport RFC. The back row completed a clean sweep at the region's end of season awards in May 2019 as he was named the Coaches Player-of-the-Year, Players' Player-of-the-Year and DOSC Player-of-the-Year. 

From his new position of Number 8, Wainwright scored against the Ospreys, as the Dragons won the derby 31–20 on 6 March 2021. His success against regional rivals continued as he touched down twice helping the Dragons beat the Scarlets 52–32 on 25 April 2021.

International career
Wainwright made his debut for the Welsh national team on 10 June 2018 versus Argentina as a second-half replacement. He was named on the bench a week prior for the match against South Africa, but did not take to the field.

He scored his debut international try, on 20 October 2019, as Wales' opening try in the 2019 Rugby World Cup quarter-final against France at the Oita stadium. A foul against him by Sébastien Vahaamahina led to Vahaamahina being sent off. Wales went on to win the match by one point and Wainwright was named Mastercard Player of the Match.

Under new Welsh coach Wayne Pivac, Wainwright underwent a shift from blindside flanker to Number 8. He was named man of the match in the win against Georgia in the 2020 Autumn Nations Series. He featured twice in the 2021 Six Nations Championship, as Wales won the title and the Triple Crown. Wainwright continued to feature for Wales throughout the 2021 end-of-year rugby union internationals and 2022 Six Nations, primarily at Number 8 but also appearing on the blindside.

Injury ruled Wainwright out of the 2022 Wales rugby union tour of South Africa, and he was omitted from the squad for the 2022 end-of-year rugby union internationals, but was selected for the Barbarians in their match against the All Blacks XV.

International tries

References

External links

Dragons profile
Wales profile

Welsh rugby union players
Dragons RFC players
Wales international rugby union players
Rugby union players from Newport, Wales
Newport RFC players
Living people
1997 births
Rugby union flankers
Rugby union number eights